WBGW may refer to:

 WBGW (AM), a radio station (1330 AM) licensed to serve Evansville, Indiana, United States
 WBGW-FM, a radio station (101.5 FM) licensed to serve Fort Branch, Indiana
 WBFB, a radio station (97.1 FM) licensed to serve Bangor, Maine, United States, which held the call sign WBGW from 1973 to 1986
 Lawas Airport (ICAO code WBGW)